The 2016–17 East Tennessee State Buccaneers basketball team represented East Tennessee State University during the 2016–17 NCAA Division I men's basketball season. The Buccaneers, led by second-year head coach Steve Forbes, played their home games at the Freedom Hall Civic Center in Johnson City, Tennessee as of the Southern Conference. They finished the season 27–8, 14–4 in SoCon play to finish in a three-way tie for the SoCon regular season championship. They defeated Mercer, Samford and UNC Greensboro to win the SoCon tournament. As a result, they received the conference's automatic bid to the NCAA tournament as the No. 13 seed in the East region. There they lost in the first round to Florida.

Previous season
The Buccaneers finished the 2015–16 season 24–12, 14–4 in SoCon play to finish in to second place. They defeated Mercer and Furman to advance to the championship game of the SoCon tournament where they lost to Chattanooga. They were invited to the inaugural Vegas 16, which only had eight teams, where they defeated Louisiana Tech in the quarterfinals before losing to Oakland in the semifinals.

Roster

}

Schedule and results
 
|-
!colspan=9 style="background:#041E42; color:#FFC72C;"| Exhibition
|-

|-
!colspan=9 style="background:#041E42; color:#FFC72C;"| Non-conference regular season
|-

|-
!colspan=9 style="background:#041E42; color:#FFC72C;"| SoCon regular season
|-

|-
!colspan=9 style="background:#041E42; color:#FFC72C;"| SoCon tournament

|-
!colspan=9 style="background:#041E42; color:#FFC72C;"| NCAA tournament

Source

References

East Tennessee State Buccaneers men's basketball seasons
East Tennessee State
East Tennessee State
East Tennessee
East Tennessee